Ross Lake is a reservoir in Ross County, Ohio, in the United States. The reservoir was created in 1967.

Ross Lake took its name from Ross County.

See also
List of lakes in Ohio

References

Reservoirs in Ohio
Bodies of water of Ross County, Ohio